Mohammed Abukhousa (born 30 December 1992) is a Palestinian sprinter. He competed at the 2013 and 2015 World Championships and at the 2016 Summer Olympics without advancing from the first round.

Personal bests
Outdoor
100 metres – 10.55 (-0.3 m/s, Strasbourg 2014) NR
200 metres – 21.26 (-0.3 m/s, Colmar 2014) NR
Indoor
60 metres – 6.77 (Doha 2016) NR

International competitions

References

External links

1992 births
Living people
Palestinian male sprinters
World Athletics Championships athletes for Palestine
Athletes (track and field) at the 2014 Asian Games
Athletes (track and field) at the 2016 Summer Olympics
Olympic athletes of Palestine
Asian Games competitors for Palestine